Robert "Bob" Shand (27 August 1866 – 1 March 1934) was a South African international rugby union player. He was born in Tulbagh and educated in Swellendam before playing provincial rugby for Griqualand West. Shand made his only two Test appearances for South Africa during Great Britain's 1891 tour, South Africa's first as a Test nation. He played, as a forward, in the 2nd and 3rd Tests of the three match series, both of which were won by Great Britain. Shand died in 1934, in Faure, at the age of 67.

References

1866 births
1934 deaths
People from Tulbagh
South African rugby union players
South Africa international rugby union players
Rugby union forwards
Rugby union players from the Western Cape
Griquas (rugby union) players